Albanese is an Italian surname. In some cases it means "Albanian", in reference to the Arbëreshë people (Italo-Albanians) of southern Italy or someone of Albanian origin. The surname is common in southern Italy but more rare elsewhere in the country. Notable people with the surname include:

Albano Albanese (1921–2010), Italian hurdler and high jumper
Alessandro Albanese (born 2000), Belgian professional footballer
Antonio Albanese (1937–2013), Italian fencer
Anthony Albanese (born 1963), Australian politician and current prime minister of Australia
Antonio Albanese (born 1964), Italian comedian, actor, director, and writer
Catherine L. Albanese (born 1940), American religious studies scholar, professor, lecturer, and author
Charles Albanese (1937–1995), American serial killer
Diego Albanese (born 1973), Argentine rugby union player
Donald J. Albanese (born 1937), American politician 
Enrico Albanese (1834–1889), Italian surgeon, a member of the Expedition of the Thousand and close friend of Garibaldi
Francesco Albanese (1912–2005), Italian tenor
Frank Albanese (1931–2015), American actor 
Giacomo Albanese (1890–1947), Italian mathematician
Albanese variety, construction of algebraic geometry, named for Giacomo Albanese
Giuseppe Albanese (born 1979), Italian pianist
Joe Albanese (1933–2000), American professional baseball player
Laura Albanese (born 1957), Canadian news anchor and politician
Lauren Albanese (born 1989), American professional tennis player
Lewis Albanese (1946–1966), US soldier posthumously awarded the Medal of Honor 
Licia Albanese (1909–2014), Italian soprano
Pellegrino Albanese (born 1991), Italian footballer
Roberto Albanese (born 1950), Italian politician and environmentalist 
Rory Albanese (born 1977), American executive producer and writer for The Daily Show with Jon Stewart
Sal Albanese (born 1949), American politician
Silvano Albanese better known by his stage name Coez (born 1983), Italian singer, rapper
Thomas Albanese (born 1988), Italian footballer
Tina Albanese, American television producer and television writer
Tom Albanese (born 1957), CEO, Rio Tinto mining company
Valentina Albanese (born 1974), Italian racing driver
Vannie Albanese (1912–1984), American football player
Vincenzo Albanese (born 1996), Italian cyclist
Vito Albanese (1918-1998), American union leader and politician

See also
Albanesi
Names of the Albanians and Albania
Albanese Candy

References

Italian-language surnames
Ethnonymic surnames
Italian toponymic surnames
fr:Albanese